Annemarie Ohler is an Austrian herpetologist and professor who concentrates on the taxonomy of amphibians. She has 3,602 citations and an h-index of 36.

Life and work 
After graduating from the federal higher boarding school in Traunsee Castle, Upper Austria, Ohler studied zoology, botany and biochemistry at the University of Vienna, where she wrote a dissertation in 1987 on the larval development of the pond frog (Pelophylax kl. esculentus), a hybridogenetic hybrid from the complex of forms of water frogs (Pelophylax) and received her Ph.D. During her studies she had a one-year research stay at the Pierre and Marie Curie University in Paris, where she studied experimental embryology. In 1988 she obtained the Diplôme d'études approfondies (DEA) from the University of Paris VII. Since 2008 she has been a professor at the Laboratory of Reptiles and Amphibians at the National Museum of Natural History, France.

Ohler is a specialist in the families of the Asian toad frog (Megophryidae) and the true frog (Ranidae), especially for species from tropical Asia and Africa. She works internationally with scientists from Southeast Asia and works with international organizations to protect amphibian species. Ohler has published more than a hundred specialist articles.

In 2015 she published the children's book La vie des grenouilles (The life of frogs) together with Alain Dubois and in 2017, also with Dubois, the work Évolution, extinction: le message des grenouilles (Evolution, extinction: the message from the frogs).

Selected taxa described by Ohler
Allopaa 
Aubria masako 
Chrysopaa 
Cyrtodactylus buchardi 
Fejervarya iskandari 
Fejervarya sahyadris  
Gracixalus 
Hylarana faber  
Lankanectes 
Leptobrachium buchardi 
Leptodactylodon blanci 
Leptolalax pluvialis 
Micrixalidae 
Nanorana rarica  
Ophryophryne gerti  
Ophryophryne hansi  
Philautus cardamonus 
Ptychadena pujoli 
Rhacophorus duboisi  
Rhacophorus kio  
Rhacophorus laoshan  
Rhacophorus suffry  
Xenophrys auralensis

References

External links
 Interview: Annemarie Ohler In:  pp. 203–207.

Austrian herpetologists
Living people
National Museum of Natural History (France) people
1960 births
Women herpetologists
Austrian women biologists
21st-century Austrian women scientists